Rick Rockefeller-Silvia (Richard London Rockefeller-Silvia) (born September 9, 1984, New York, USA) is an equestrian athlete, equine breeder and former model.

Rockefeller-Silvia first garnered media attention in 2005 during the inception of his sport horse breeding program, "Dream Street Stallions". Rockefeller-Silvia purchased and imported breeding stock from Europe. Shortly thereafter, under the direction of Olympic Bronze Medalist Lisa Wilcox, Rockefeller-Silvia's stallion, Lullaby, became the United States Equestrian Team's alternate for the Young Horse World Championships in 2006.  That same year, Rockefeller-Silvia’s program took center stage, winning multiple "United States Dressage Federation" ‘Horse of The Year’ titles.

In 2007, his stallion Starlight, set a record breaking year end score of (86%), not only earning him the title of The United States Dressage Federation (USDF) "Horse Of The Year". But, also a place in the USDF 'Hall of Fame', on the 'Traveling Trot Perpetual Trophy'. Rockefeller-Silvia is the youngest owner in history to have had his program or stock recognized in the USDF 'Hall of Fame'.  That same year Rockefeller-Silvia ranked 8th nationally in the United States Equestrian Federation Grand Prix standings.

In 2008 Rockefeller-Silvia won the title of ‘Grand Champion’ of Dressage at Devon with Starlight, the youngest owner in history to do so,  further signifying his successful contributions to equine breeding programs across the United States.  Additionally, Starlight produced a 100% 'first premium' foal crop in 2008, under Rockefeller-Silvia's guidance.

Rockefeller-Silvia has earned three 'top ten' placements at the National Young Horse Championships. Including a Bronze medal at the "2010 National Young Horse Championships" held in Wayne, Illinois.  

Rockefeller-Silvia scored the highest on the final day of the West Palm Beach National Show of the Global Dressage Festival's" inaugural year (2012) Wellington, Florida.

At age 21 Rockefeller-Silvia competed internationally at the Grand Prix level (Olympic level) of equestrian sport successfully and was awarded a United States Dressage Federation Gold Medal in recognition of his excellence as an equestrian sports athlete.

For nearly a decade Rockefeller-Silvia consistently ranked in the 'top ten' owners in the United States of America (United States Equestrian Federation) with his winning string of horses.

References

External links

"Starlight, Grand, Dressage at Devon"
"Rockefeller-Silvia & Sakramenter set a record score at The Global Dressage Festival, Wellington, FL"
"Starlight, Horse of The Year" 
"Rockefeller-Silvia's Lullaby gains Elite Status" 
"Lullaby is Elite" 
"Karen-Rehbein, gets the ride on Starlight"
"Starlight exported to Karen Rehbein" 
"Grand Champion of Devon, Starlight exported to Germany" 
"Rockefeller-Silvia captures dual win" 
"Rockefeller-Silvia YouTube"
"Rockefeller-Silvia, Desperado"
"Dressage Hub"

American male equestrians
Living people
1984 births
Sportspeople from New York (state)
American dressage riders